Steven Scott Harwell (born January 9, 1967) is a retired American singer and musician, best known as the former lead vocalist and frontman for the rock band Smash Mouth. He and bassist Paul De Lisle were the only two constant members of the band until Harwell's retirement.

Career 
Greg Camp formed Smash Mouth with Harwell, Kevin Coleman, and Paul De Lisle. Harwell was previously a rapper in F.O.S. Harwell was a featured cast member in the sixth season of the VH1 reality show The Surreal Life in 2006. He has appeared on other television and radio shows, as well as making a cameo in the 2001 film Rat Race. He is best known for the song "All Star", which was popularized as an internet meme following the release of the 2001 movie Shrek.

He also performed two songs, "Beside Myself" and "Everything Just Crazy", for the 2013 South Korean-Chinese animated film Pororo, The Racing Adventure. On August 27, 2016, during a performance with Smash Mouth in Urbana, Illinois, Harwell collapsed on stage and was taken by ambulance to a hospital. The band completed the concert without him, with De Lisle taking over on vocals.

In October 2021, the band performed at a beer and wine festival in Bethel, New York, where Harwell appeared to be intoxicated, threatening audience members and performing what looked like a Nazi salute. Following the performance, Harwell announced his retirement due to ongoing health issues.

Personal life 
Harwell had a son named Presley who died in July 2001 from acute lymphocytic leukemia at the age of 6 months. Subsequently, Harwell created a medical research fund in Presley's name.

References

External links 

1967 births
Living people
American male singers
American rock singers
Musicians from San Jose, California
Smash Mouth members